Davari-ye Pain (also Romanized as Dāvarī-ye Pā’īn; also known as Dāvarī) is a village in Dar Pahn Rural District, Senderk District, Minab County, Hormozgan Province, Iran. At the 2006 census, its population was 114, in 25 families.

References 

Populated places in Minab County